Margaret Pollock Sherwood (November 1, 1864September 24, 1955) was an American professor of English literature and author of novels, short stories, poetry, and essays.

Early life and education
Margaret Pollock Sherwood, sister of Mary Sherwood, was born on November 1, 1864, in Ballston, New York. She graduated from secondary school at a private boarding school in Newburgh, New York, and from Vassar College in 1886. In 1888, after a semester of study at the University of Zurich, she studied for a semester at the University of Oxford. She taught in Wellesley College's English department from 1889 to 1931, when she retired. In 1898, she received a Ph.D. from Yale University and in 1920 a Doctor of Letters from New York University. For a number of years she sometimes taught part-time at the University Extension of Columbia University.

Career 
Her first novel An Experiment in Altruism (1895, Macmillan), published under the pseudonym "Elizabeth Hastings", generated considerable discussion as to the novelist's true identity.

Her novel Henry Worthington, Idealist (1899, Macmillan) fictionalized a debate among the Wellesley faculty on whether to accept money from John D. Rockefeller. Her novel Daphne, an Autumn Pastoral was written after a year spent partly in England and partly in Italy and was published in 1903 in The Atlantic Monthly in serial form. Montrose Press in Wakefield, Massachusetts published her novel Pilgrim Feet when she was eighty-one years old.

She contributed poetry, criticism, and essays to Scribner's Magazine, The Atlantic Monthly, North American Review, and The Smart Set. The Cornhill Magazine published several of her short stories.

She gave several talks at Vassar. Her will bequeathed $100,000 to Vassar College and $140,000 to Hindman Settlement School. Her bequest to Vassar established The Margaret Pollock Sherwood 1886 Fund for the college's library. In 1958 the Margaret Sherwood Memorial Window, designed by Martha Hale Shackford (Wellesley Class of 1896), was dedicated in Wellesley's Houghton Memorial Chapel. In 1953 Margaret P. Sherwood established the Martha Hale Shackford Scholarship at Wellesley.

Sherwood died on September 24, 1955, at Newton-Wellesley Hospital in Newton, Massachusetts.

Books
 
  (Ph.D. thesis)
 
 
  (illustrated by Sarah S. Stilwell)
 
  (collection of short stories previously published in Scribner's Magazine, The Atlantic Monthly, and McClure's; illustrated by Sarah S. Stilwell)

as Elizabeth Hastings

Plays

References

External links

 
 

1864 births
1955 deaths
Vassar College alumni
Wellesley College faculty
Pseudonymous women writers
American women novelists
American women short story writers
People from Ballston, New York
19th-century pseudonymous writers
20th-century pseudonymous writers